The Globular Amphora culture (GAC,  (KAK)), c. 3400–2800 BC, is an archaeological culture in Central Europe. Marija Gimbutas assumed an Indo-European origin, though this is contradicted by newer genetic studies that show a connection to the earlier wave of Early European Farmers rather than to Western Steppe Herders from the Ukrainian and western-southern Russian steppes.

The GAC preceded the Corded Ware culture in its central area. Somewhat to the south and west, it was bordered by the Baden culture. To the northeast was the Narva culture. It occupied much of the same area as the earlier Funnelbeaker culture. The name was coined by Gustaf Kossinna because of the characteristic pottery, globular-shaped pots with two to four handles.

Extent
The Globular Amphora culture was located in an area defined by the Elbe catchment on the west and that of the Vistula on the east, extending southwards to the middle Dniester and eastwards to reach the Dnieper. West of the Elbe, some globular amphorae are found in megalithic graves. The GAC finds in the steppe area are normally attributed to a rather late expansion between 2950 and 2350 cal. BC from a centre in Wolhynia and Podolia.

Economy

The economy was based on raising a variety of livestock, pigs particularly in its earlier phase, in distinction to the Funnelbeaker culture's preference for cattle. Settlements are sparse, and these normally  just contain small clusters pits. No convincing house-plans have yet been excavated. It is suggested that some of these settlements were not year-round, or indeed may have been temporary.

Burials

The GAC is primarily known from its burials. Inhumation was in a pit or cist. A variety of grave offerings were left, including animal parts (such as a pig's jaw) or even whole animals, e.g., oxen. Grave gifts include the typical globular amphorae and stone axes. There are also cattle-burials, often in pairs, accompanied by grave gifts. There are also secondary burials in Megalithic graves.

Interpretation

The inclusion of animals in the grave is seen as an intrusive cultural element by Marija Gimbutas. The practice of suttee, hypothesized by Gimbutas is also seen as  a highly intrusive cultural element. The supporters of the Kurgan hypothesis point to these distinctive burial practices and state this may represent one of the earliest migrations of Indo-Europeans into Central Europe. In this context and given its area of occupation, this culture has been claimed as the underlying culture of a Germanic-Baltic-Slavic continuum.

Genetics

Tassi et al. (2017) extracted fifteen samples of mtDNA. The majority of the samples belonged to subclades of U and Haplogroup H (mtDNA), along with J, W and K. The remains were found to be closely related to Early European Farmers and Western Hunter-Gatherers, with little genetic relation to the Yamnaya culture of Western Steppe Herders in the east. The authors of the study suggested that the Globulara Amphora culture was non-Indo-European-speaking, but with cultural influences from Yamnaya.

Mathieson et al. (2018) included a genetic analysis of eight males of the Globular Amphora culture. Three of them carried haplogroup I2a2a1b and a subclade of it; two carried I2a2; one carried I2; one carried BT and one carried CT. According to admixture analysis they also had approximately 70% EEF ancestry and 30% WHG ancestry, some of them with negligible Eastern Hunter-Gatherer and Yamnaya traces.

Schroeder et al. (2019) examined 15 skeletons from the Koszyce mass grave in southern Poland, which is ascribed to the Globular Amphora culture. The individuals were all shown to be members of an extended family, and to have been buried with great care by someone who knew them very well. Most of them were female and children. All had been executed by a violent blow to the head, perhaps by invading Corded Ware groups. The older males of the family are missing from the grave, suggesting that they were away or had fled. Of the eight samples of Y-DNA extracted, all were found to belong to I2a-L801. The fifteen samples of mtDNA extracted belonged to various subclades of T, H, J, K, HV. The skeletons were determined to have about 70% EEF ancestry and 30% WHG ancestry, meaning they had no Indo-European WSH-ancestry. The archaeological and genetic evidence collected from the grave indicated that the Globular Amphora culture was patriarchal and kinship-oriented, which appears to have been the norm for Late Neolithic communities in Central Europe.

Gallery

See also

 Unetice culture

Notes

References

Sources
 Mikhail M. Charniauski et al. (eds.), Eastern exodus of the globular amphora people: 2950-2350 BC. Poznań, Adam Mickiewicz University, Institute of Prehistory 1996, Baltic-Pontic studies 4.
J. P. Mallory, "Globular Amphora Culture", Encyclopedia of Indo-European Culture, Fitzroy Dearborn, 1997.

External links

 
Archaeological cultures of Central Europe
Archaeological cultures of Eastern Europe
Chalcolithic cultures of Europe
Archaeological cultures in Belarus
Archaeological cultures in the Czech Republic
Archaeological cultures in Germany
Archaeological cultures in Moldova
Archaeological cultures in Poland
Archaeological cultures in Romania
Archaeological cultures in Ukraine